The Men's 100 metre backstroke S2 event at the 2016 Paralympic Games took place on 9 September 2016, at the Olympic Aquatics Stadium. Two heats were held. The swimmers with the eight fastest times advanced to the final.

Heats

Heat 1 
9:30 9 September 2016:

Heat 2 
9:36 9 September 2016:

Final 
17:40 9 September 2016:

Notes

Swimming at the 2016 Summer Paralympics